is an asteroid, classified as near-Earth object and potentially hazardous asteroid of the Apollo group. It is a possible candidate for the parent body of the Chelyabinsk superbolide.

Discovery, orbit and physical properties
 was discovered by Richard A. Kowalski on 10 March 2011 while observing for the Mount Lemmon Survey.

Its orbit is typical of Apollo asteroids and is characterized by significant eccentricity (0.54), low inclination (3.36º), and a semi-major axis of 1.65 AU. Upon discovery, it was classified as an Earth crosser, a near-Earth asteroid (NEA) and a potentially hazardous asteroid (PHA) by the Minor Planet Center. It was listed on the Sentry Risk Table for less than one day.

Relationship to the Chelyabinsk superbolide
Recent calculations indicate that this object is a plausible candidate to be the parent body of the Chelyabinsk superbolide, since its orbit is very similar to the computed, pre-impact path of the Chelyabinsk meteoroid. It has relatively frequent close encounters with Venus, the Earth–Moon system, and Mars. Asteroid  experiences close approaches to the Earth–Moon system following a rather regular pattern, every 17 years approximately due to the combined action of multiple secular resonances.

Visibility
Future opposition windows are: 7 June 2016 at magnitude 24.5, and 28 May 2018 at magnitude 24.6. The best observation window will be on 2–23 September 2025. Depending on the Earth approach distance (0.04–0.12 AU), it should be brighter than magnitude 19.

See also
 Carbonaceous chondrite
 Meteorite

Notes

  This is assuming an albedo of 0.20–0.04.

References

External links 
  data at MPC
 MPEC 2011-E59 : 2011 EO40 (Discovery MPEC)
 Russian meteor may have gangmates in tow, Nature, short article
Has the Chelyabinsk Meteor Parent Asteroid Been Found?, Bad Astronomy blog entry
 
 
 

Minor planet object articles (unnumbered)
Discoveries by Richard Kowalski
Earth-crossing asteroids

20110310